Maximo Sergio Querol (born 12 April 1965) is a former Cuban sprinter.

References

1965 births
Living people
Cuban male sprinters
Place of birth missing (living people)
Athletes (track and field) at the 1987 Pan American Games
Pan American Games medalists in athletics (track and field)
Pan American Games silver medalists for Cuba
Central American and Caribbean Games gold medalists for Cuba
Competitors at the 1986 Central American and Caribbean Games
Central American and Caribbean Games medalists in athletics
Medalists at the 1987 Pan American Games
20th-century Cuban people